South Korean actors are listed as follows:
 List of South Korean actresses
 List of South Korean male actors